Hubler or Hübler is a surname. Notable people with the surname include:

Alfred Hübler (1957–2018), research physicist and director of the Center for Complex Systems Research
Anna Hübler (1885–1976), German pairs figure skater
Gary Hubler (1955–2007), crop duster and commercial transport pilot with over 16,000 flight hours from Caldwell, Idaho
Heinrich Hübler (1822–1894), the hornist in the Dresden Royal Court orchestra from 1844 until his retirement in 1891
 Howie Hubler is the bond trader responsible for the single largest trading loss in history in the sub-prime crisis of 2008
Jens Hübler (born 1961), retired East German sprinter who specialized in the 100 and 200 metres
John Hubler Stover (1833–1889), U.S. Representative from Missouri
Ludovic Hubler, French hitchhiker, most famous for his 5 year long tour of the world
Mary Hubler, Democratic Party member of the Wisconsin State Assembly, representing the 75th Assembly District since 1984
Richard G. Hubler (1912–1981), prolific American author of biographies, fiction and non-fiction